Daniel "Danny" Vandervoort (born March 13, 1994) is a professional Canadian football wide receiver for the Edmonton Elks of the Canadian Football League (CFL). Vandervoort was drafted in the first round, third overall by the BC Lions in the 2017 CFL Draft. He played college football at McMaster University.

College career
Vandervoort played college football at McMaster University playing for the McMaster Marauders where he was named CIS rookie of the year in 2013. Vandervoort collected 831 yards and five touchdowns in his final season with the Mauraders. Over four years at McMaster, he hauled in 148 receptions and 2,572 receiving yards. His 29 career receiving touchdowns are also third all-time in U Sports history.

Professional career

BC Lions
Vandervoort was the third overall selection in the 2017 CFL Draft. He dressed in all 18 games during the 2017 season and recorded his first reception on July 21, 2017 against the Winnipeg Blue Bombers. That was his only catch of the season. Despite dressing in eight games in 2018 for the Lions Vandervoort did not record a catch. On April 30, 2019, Vandervoort was released by the Lions as the team trimmed its roster down to 75 players in preparation for the new season.

Edmonton Eskimos/Elks 
On September 30, 2019, Vandervoort signed with the Edmonton Eskimos (CFL). He did not make an appearance during the 2019 season. After the 2020 season was cancelled Vandervoort signed a one-year contract extension with the Elks on December 26, 2020. He had his most productive season on the field in 2022, catching eight passes for 75 yards and one touchdown. On January 17, 2023 Vandervoort and the Elks agreed to another contract extension.

Career statistics

References

External links
Edmonton Elks bio
McMaster bio

1994 births
Living people
McMaster Marauders football players
BC Lions players
Canadian football wide receivers
Players of Canadian football from Ontario
Sportspeople from Barrie
Canadian people of Dutch descent
Edmonton Elks players